is a private university in Kashiwazaki, Niigata, Japan. The predecessor of the school was founded in 1947. It was chartered as a junior college in 1950 and became a four-year college in 1988.

External links
 Official website 

Educational institutions established in 1947
Private universities and colleges in Japan
Universities and colleges in Niigata Prefecture
1947 establishments in Japan
Kashiwazaki, Niigata